A department is an administrative or political division in several countries. Departments are the first-level divisions of 11 countries, nine in the Americas and two in Africa. An additional 10 countries use departments as second-level divisions, eight in Africa, and one each in the Americas and Europe.

As a territorial entity, "department" was first used by the French Revolutionary governments, apparently to emphasize that each territory was simply an administrative sub-division of the united sovereign nation. (The term "department", in other contexts, means an administrative sub-division of a larger organization.) This attempt to de-emphasize local political identity contrasts strongly with countries divided into "states" (implying local sovereignty).

The division of France into departments was a project particularly identified with the French revolutionary leader the Abbé Sieyès, although it had already been frequently discussed and written about by many politicians and thinkers. The earliest known suggestion of it is from 1764 in the writings of d'Argenson.

Today, departments may exist either with or without a representative assembly and executive head depending upon the countries' constitutional and administrative structure.

Countries using departments

  Argentina*
  Benin
  Bolivia
  Burkina Faso
  Cameroon
  Chad
  Colombia
  Republic of the Congo
  Côte d'Ivoire
  El Salvador
  France
  Gabon
  Guatemala
  Haiti
  Honduras
  Mauritania
  Nicaragua
  Niger
  Paraguay
  Senegal
  Uruguay

*All provinces except Buenos Aires province.

Former countries using departments

  Batavian Republic
  Cisalpine Republic
  French Empire
  Gran Colombia
  Centralist Republic of Mexico
  Second Mexican Empire
  Kingdom of Holland
  Kingdom of Italy (Napoleonic)
  Italian Republic (Napoleonic)
  Peru**
  Duchy of Warsaw
  United States***
  Kingdom of Westphalia

**Replaced by regions in 2002.
***Before Alaska became a U.S. state, it was designated as the "Department of Alaska".

References

External links
http://www.statoids.com/uuy.html

See also
 Administrative divisions
 Departments of the Duchy of Warsaw
 Departments of France
 Overseas departments and territories of France

 
Types of administrative division